Le Souich is a commune in the Pas-de-Calais department in the Hauts-de-France region of France.

Geography

Population

See also
Communes of the Pas-de-Calais department

References

Souich